Cheshmeh Pahn (also Romanized as Chashmeh Pahn; also known as Cheshmeh Pahn Nanaj) is a village in Tork-e Gharbi Rural District, Jowkar District, Malayer County, Hamadan Province, Iran. At the 2006 census, its population was 101, in 26 families.

References 

Populated places in Malayer County